Mike Massie (born January 8, 1954) is a Democratic former member of the Wyoming Senate, having represented the 9th district from 1998 to 2010. He previously served in the Wyoming House of Representatives from 1995 through 1998.

After considering a run for governor in 2010, he instead sought the position of State Superintendent of Public Instruction. He was defeated in the general election by the Republican Cindy Hill of Cheyenne, 113,026 votes (59.2 percent) to 71,772 (37.6 percent). Hill had unseated incumbent Jim McBride in the Republican primary.

Notes

External links
Wyoming State Legislature - Senator Mike Massie official WY Senate website
Project Vote Smart - Senator Mike Massie (WY) profile
Follow the Money - Mike Massie
2006 2004 20021998 1996 1994 campaign contributions

1954 births
Living people
Democratic Party members of the Wyoming House of Representatives
Politicians from Akron, Ohio
Democratic Party Wyoming state senators